Kyle Langford may refer to:

 Kyle Langford (footballer) (born 1996),  Australian rules footballer
 Kyle Langford (runner) (born 1996), British middle-distance runner
 Kyle Langford (sailor) (born 1989), Australian sailor